Queen's Birthday Honours are announced on or around the date of the Queen's Official Birthday. Publication dates vary from year to year. Most are published in supplements to the London Gazette and many are formally conferred by the monarch (or her representative) some time after the date of the announcement, particularly for those service people on active duty.

The 1994 Queen's Birthday honours lists were announced on 10 June 1994 for the United Kingdom, New Zealand, Grenada, Papua New Guinea, Solomon Islands, Tuvalu and Belize. The list for Australia was announced separately on 13 June.

Recipients of awards are shown below as they were styled before their new honours.

United Kingdom

Life peer (Baron)
Professor Sir David Chilton Phillips, K.B.E., F.R.S., Emeritus Professor of Molecular Biophysics in the University of Oxford.
Professor Sir Charles Randolph Quirk, C.B.E., Professor of English and Fellow of University College, London.
Sir Allen John George Sheppard, Chairman, Grand Metropolitan plc.

Privy Counsellor

Michael Wolfgang Laurence Morris, M.P., Chairman of Ways and Means and Deputy Speaker of the House of Commons.
Richard Francis Needham, M.P., Member of Parliament for Wiltshire North and Minister of State, Department of Trade and Industry.
Sir Christopher James Prout, T.D., Q.C., Member of the European Parliament for Shropshire and Stafford.

Knight Bachelor
Jeremy Hugh Beecham, Chairman, Association of Metropolitan Authorities. For services to Local Government.
William Richard Benyon, D.L. For political service.
Gordon Smith Grieve Beveridge, President and Vice-Chancellor, The Queen's University, Belfast. For services to Higher Education.
Andrew Bowden, M.B.E., M.P., Member of Parliament for Brighton Kemptown. For political service.
Professor Norman Leslie Browse, President, Royal College of Surgeons of England and Professor of Surgery, St Thomas's Hospital, London. For services to Medicine.
Joseph Stuart Burgess, C.B.E., Chairman, Anglia and Oxford Regional Health Authority. For services to Health Care.
Kenneth Melville Carlisle, M.P., Member of Parliament for Lincoln. For political service.
Robert Charlton, C.B.E. For services to Sport, particularly Association Football.
Paul Leslie Condon, Q.P.M., Commissioner, Metropolitan Police.
Alan George Cox, C.B.E., Chief Executive, ASW Holdings plc. For services to Industry in Wales.
John Sagar Daniel, Vice Chancellor, Open University. For services to Higher Education.
Jeremy Vernon Elwes, C.B.E. For political and public service.
Robert Evans, C.B.E., lately Chairman and Chief Executive, British Gas plc. For services to the Gas Industry and to Export.
Ronald Garrick, C.B.E., Managing Director and Chief Executive, the Weir Group plc. For services to Industry and to Public Life in Scotland.
John Michael Gorst, M.P., Member of Parliament for Hendon North. For political service.
Martin Wyatt Holdgate, C.B., lately Director General, International Union for Conservation of Nature and Natural Resources. For services to Conservation.
Professor David Alan Hopwood, F.R.S., John Innes Professor of Genetics, University of East Anglia, Norwich and Head, Department of Genetics, John Innes Centre. For services to Science.
Ludovic Henry Coverley Kennedy. For political service and for services to broadcasting and writing.
Edwin Alfred Grenville Manton. For charitable services to the Tate Gallery.
Professor Laurence Woodward Martin, D.L., Director, Royal Institute of International Affairs.
Charles David Naish, D.L., President, National Farmers' Union. For services to Agriculture.
Paul Henry Newall, T.D., Lord Mayor of London. For public and charitable services in London.
Professor Roger Penrose, F.R.S., Rouse Ball Professor of Mathematics, University of Oxford. For services to Science.
Christopher Matthew Peterson, C.B.E., T.D., D.L. For political service.
Brian Ivor Pitman, Director and Chief Executive, Lloyds Bank. For services to Banking.
Simon Denis Rattle, C.B.E., Conductor and Music Director, City of Birmingham Symphony Orchestra. For services to Music.
Timothy Miles Bindon Rice. For services to the Arts, particularly Music, and Sport.
Neil McGowan Shaw, Executive Chairman, Tate and Lyle plc. For services to the Community and to the Food Industry.
Professor Hans Wolfgang Singer, Emeritus Professor, University of Sussex. For services to Economic Issues.
Professor William Duncan Paterson Stewart, Chief Scientific Adviser, Cabinet Office.
Ray Stanley Tindle, C.B.E., D.L., Chairman, Tindle Newspapers. For services to the Newspaper Industry.
Professor Leslie Arnold Turnberg, President, Royal College of Physicians and Professor of Medicine, University of Manchester. For services to Medicine.
Professor David Philip Tweedie, Chairman, Accounting Standards Board. For services to the Accountancy Profession.

Order of the Bath

Knight Grand Cross of the Order of the Bath (GCB)
General Sir Charles Ronald Llewelyn Guthrie, K.C.B., L.V.O., O.B.E., A.D.C. Gen (461440), late Welsh Guards.
Air Chief Marshal Sir John Thomson, K.C.B., C.B.E., A.F.C., Royal Air Force.
Sir Clifford John Boulton, K.C.B., Clerk of the House of Commons.

Knight Commander of the Order of the Bath (KCB)
Vice Admiral Peter Charles Abbott.
Lieutenant General Robert Jeremy Ross, C.B., O.B.E.
Major General John Paul Foley, C.B., O.B.E., M.C., late The Royal Green Jackets.
Air Marshal Timothy Garden, C.B., Royal Air Force.
Michael Addison John Wheeler-Booth, Clerk of the Parliaments, House of Lords.
Nicholas Jeremy Monck, C.B., Permanent Secretary, Department of Employment.

Companion of the Order of the Bath (CB)
Military Division
Major General Andrew Myles Keeling, C.B.E.
Rear Admiral Jeremy Thomas Sanders, O.B.E.
Major General Walter James Courage, M.B.E., late 5th Royal Inniskilling Dragoon Guards.
Major General Robin Digby Grist, O.B.E., late The Gloucestershire Regiment.
Major General Anthony Charles Peter Stone, late Royal Regiment of Artillery.
Major General Michael Trenchard Tennant, late Royal Regiment of Artillery.
Air Vice-Marshal Anthony John Crowther Bagnall, O.B.E., Royal Air Force.
Air Vice-Marshal Peter Dodworth, O.B.E., A.F.C., Royal Air Force.

Civil Division
Terence John Brack, Grade 3, Ministry of Defence.
Patrick Carvill, Permanent Secretary, Department of Education for Northern Ireland.
Charles Anthony Clark, Grade 3, Department of Education.
John Edward William D'Ancona, Grade 3, Department of Trade and Industry.
John William Scott Dempster, Grade 2, Department of Transport.
Peter Sydney Draper, Grade 3, PSA Services.
Michael Ernest George Fogden, Chief Executive, Employment Service, Department of Employment.
John Frederick Halliday, Grade 2, Home Office.
Michael Denis Huebner, Grade 2, Lord Chancellor's Department.
Melvyn Gwynne Jeremiah, Grade 3, Department of Health.
John Kenneth Ledlie, O.B.E., Grade 2, Ministry of Defence.
John Wyn Owen, lately Grade 3, Welsh Office.
Michael Alan Pickford, Grade 3, Government Actuary's Department.
Quentin Thomas, Grade 2, Northern Ireland Office.
Juliet Louise Wheldon, Legal Secretary to the Law Officers.
David Anthony Wilkinson, Grade 3, Office of Public Service and Science.

Order of St Michael and St George

Knight Commander of the Order of St Michael and St George (KCMG)
Leonard Vincent Appleyard, C.M.G., H.M. Ambassador, Peking.
Alistair John Hunter, C.M.G., H.M. Consul-General and Director-General of Trade and Investment, New York.

Companion of the Order of St Michael and St George (CMG)
John Kelvin Toulmin, Q.C., lately President, Council of Bars and Law Societies of Europe (C.C.B.E.). For services to the Legal Profession.
Hugh Llewellyn Davies, Senior Representative, Sino-British Joint Liaison Group, Hong Kong.
Simon William John Fuller, Head of UK Delegation to the Conference on Security and Co-operation in Europe, Vienna.
Jeffrey Russell James, Chargé d'Affaires, H.M. Embassy, Tehran.
Philip Alexander McLean, Minister, H.M. Embassy, Peking.
Roland Hedley Smith, Minister, UK Delegation to the North Atlantic Treaty Organization, Brussels.
Adrian Charles Thorpe, Minister, H.M. Embassy, Tokyo.
Roger Clive Tutt, M.B.E., Foreign and Commonwealth Office.

Royal Victorian Order

Knight Grand Cross of the Royal Victorian Order (GCVO)
The Right Honourable Matthew White, Viscount Ridley, K.G., T.D.

Knight Commander of the Royal Victorian Order (KCVO)
Colonel Michael William McCorkell, O.B.E., T.D.
The Right Honourable Savile William Francis Crossley, Baron Somerleyton.
Doctor Conrad Marshall John Fisher Swan, C.V.O.
Lieutenant Colonel Blair Aubyn Stewart-Wilson, C.V.O.

Commander of the Royal Victorian Order (CVO)
Commander Richard John Aylard, Royal Navy.
Marsom Henry Boyd-Carpenter.
The Lady Margaret Colville.
Terence Tenison Cuneo, O.B.E.
Michael Charles Gerrard Peat.
Frederick John Pervin.
John Handby Thompson, C.B.

Lieutenant of the Royal Victorian Order (LVO)
Philip David Charles Collins.
Air Commodore Alan Charles Curry, O.B.E., Royal Air Force (Retired).
John Trevor Dean.
Suresh Dinkar Dhargalkar.
Commander David Andrew Kenneth Freeman, Royal Navy.
Peter Llewellyn Gwynn-Jones.

Member of the Royal Victorian Order (MVO)
Stephen Charles Batchelor.
Leslie Arthur Broome.
Inspector John Leonard Frederick Brownridge, Metropolitan Police.
Miss Heather Rosalind Colebrook.
Captain The Honourable Edward Lionel Seymour Dawson-Damer.
Inspector John William Harding, Metropolitan Police.
Miss Belinda Jane Harley.
Lieutenant Commander Robert Collie Henry, Royal Navy.
Ronald Charles Aver Hooper.
Anthony John Jarred, R.V.M.
Lawrence Peter David Salter.
Patricia Eileen, Mrs Simmonds.
Miss Helen Andrea Louise Spiller.

Bar to the Royal Victorian Medal (Silver) (RVM)
Leslie Donald Hillier, R.V.M.

Royal Victorian Medal (Silver) (RVM)
David Leonard Biggs.
Henry Charles Bynoth.
Christopher Arthur Chiverton.
Peter Robert Fielder.
Elizabeth Muriel, Mrs Greenfield.
Chief Technician Barry Neil Kelly, Royal Air Force.
Elizabeth Pamela, Mrs Kirby.
Peter Horace Matthews.
Robert Raymond Melling.
Police Constable Ian Miles, Metropolitan Police.
Chief Petty Officer Marine Engineering Mechanic (Mechanical) Martin Peet.
Albert Joseph Peterson.
Robert John Richard Spokes.
Gordon Thomas George Stephens.
William Stanley Walker.
Chief Technician Richard Henry Wicks, Royal Air Force.
Divisional Sergeant Major Drummond Alfred Window, M.B.E.

Order of the Companions of Honour (CH)
Sir Alec Guinness, C.B.E., Actor. For services to Drama.
Professor Reginald Victor Jones, C.B., C.B.E. For services to Science.
The Right Honourable David Anthony Llewellyn, Baron Owen, EU Co-Chairman of the International Conference on the former Yugoslavia.

Order of the British Empire

Dame Commander of the Order of the British Empire (DBE)
Hazel Byford, O.B.E. For political and public service.
Diana Rigg, C.B.E., Actress. For services to Drama.

Knight Commander of the Order of the British Empire (KBE)
Keith Elliot Hedley Morris, C.M.G., H.M. Ambassador, Bogota.

Commander of the Order of the British Empire (CBE)

Military Division
Royal Navy
Captain Bryan Burns, Royal Navy.
Captain Ian Forbes, Royal Navy. 
Commodore Richard Montgomery Thorn, Royal Fleet Auxiliary.

Army
Brigadier James Robert Drew (468987), late Corps of Royal Electrical and Mechanical Engineers. 
Colonel Robert Duncan Seaton Gordon (490208), late 17th/21st Lancers. 
Colonel Brendan Charles Lambe (492701), late Royal Regiment of Artillery.
Brigadier Herbert Arthur Woolnough, O.B.E. (461526), late The Worcestershire and Sherwood Foresters Regiment (since retired).

Royal Air Force
Air Commodore Robert David Arnott, Royal Air Force.
Group Captain Michael Frederick John Tinley, A.E., A.D.C., Royal Auxiliary Air Force.
Acting Air Commodore James Leslie Uprichard, Royal Air Force.

Civil Division
Michael David Abrahams, M.B.E. For services to the community in Yorkshire.
Keith Ackroyd, Managing Director, Retail Division, Boots Company and Chairman, British Retail Consortium. For services to the Retail Industry.
The Right Reverend Michael Edgar Adie, lately Chairman, General Synod Board of Education. For services to Education.
Michael Stanley Alderson, Chairman, Motorola Ltd. For services to the Electronics Industry.
Philip John Attenborough, Deputy Chairman, Hodder Headline. For services to Publishing.
Trevor Edward Bailey. For services to cricket.
Professor Kenneth Barker, Chief Executive and Vice Chancellor, De Montfort University, Leicester. For services to Higher Education.
Peter William Barker, lately Chairman, South East Thames Regional Health Authority. For services to Health Care.
Allan Geoffrey Beard, C.B., Governor and Honorary Treasurer, Motability. For services to people with disabilities.
Timothy Reuben Ladbroke Black, Chief Executive, Marie Stopes International. For services to Family Planning in Developing Countries.
John Boorman, Film Director. For services to the Film Industry.
George Cooper Borthwick, Managing Director, Etrucon Ltd. For services to Industry and to the community in Scotland.
His Honour Henry Callow, lately Her Majesty's Second Deemster, Isle of Man.
Herbert Anthony Cann, Chairman, East Lancashire Training and Enterprise Council Ltd. For services to Training.
Iain Donald Cheyne, General Manager, Corporate Banking, Lloyds Bank. For services to the Administration of the Canary Wharf Development, London.
John Colin Leslie Cox, Director General, Chemical Industries Association Ltd. For services to the Chemical Industry
Professor Barry Cunliffe, Professor of European Archaeology, University of Oxford. For services to Archaeology.
Peter Hampson Dawe, lately Grade 5, Department of Transport.
Hugh Brendan Devlin,  Consultant Surgeon, North Tees NHS Trust. For services to Medicine.
Heather May Dick, Professor of Medical Microbiology, University of Dundee. For services to Medicine and to Food Safety.
John Neville Diserens, lately Finance Director, Intervention Board.
Professor Charles Thomas Elliott, FRS., Grade 4, Defence Research Agency, Ministry of Defence.
George Esson, Q.P.M., lately Chief Constable, Dumfries and Galloway Constabulary.
Douglas McKay Fairbairn. For political service.
Professor Alexander Taylor Florence, Dean, the School of Pharmacy, University of London. For services to Pharmacy.
Dennis Ernest Gilbert, Managing Director (Shipbuilding Division), Vickers Shipbuilding & Engineering For services to the Defence Industry.
David Glencross, Chief Executive, Independent Television Commission. For services to Broadcasting.
Charles Milne Glennie, Registrar General, General Register Office for Scotland.
Charles Ireland Gray, lately President, Convention of Scottish Local Authorities. For services to Local Government in Scotland.
Richard Joseph Haas. For charitable services, especially to Science and Technology.
Ronald Joseph Harrison, Chief Executive, Student Loans Company. For services to Higher Education.
John Edgar Harvey. For political and public service.
David Edwin Hatch. For services to Radio Broadcasting.
Roger Matthew Hay, Grade 5, Forestry Commission.
Professor Robert Brian Heap, F.R.S., Director, Agricultural and Food Research Council's Babraham Institute. For services to Science.
Max Hebditch, Director, Museum of London.
James Henry, O.B.E. For services to the Construction Industry.
Robin Arthur Elidyr Herbert, lately President and Chairman of the Council, Royal Horticultural Society. For services to Horticulture.
John Hoddinott, Q.P.M., Chief Constable, Hampshire Constabulary.
Thelma Holt, Director, Thelma Holt Ltd and Cultural Producer, Royal National Theatre. For services to the Theatre.
Noel Denis Ing, Senior Legal Adviser, Monopolies and Mergers Commission.
Anthony John Jackson, O.B.E., Chief Executive, Blue Circle Enterprises. For services to the Construction Industry.
Eva Jiricna. For services to Interior Design.
Christopher William Jonas, Senior Partner, Drivers Jonas. For services to the Chartered Surveying Profession.
William Barry Keates, Director of Personnel, British Insulated Callender's Cables. For services to Industrial Relations.
Barbara Mary Kelly, Grade 5, Overseas Development Administration.
Stuart Oliver Knussen, Composer and Conductor. For services to Music.
Dennis William Lait, lately Chairman, Graseby Dynamics Ltd. For services to the Defence Industry.
Philip Gordon Langridge, Opera Singer. For services to Music.
Richard Leslie Henry Lawrence, Grade 5, Her Majesty's Board of Customs and Excise.
Richard Henry Lawson, Chairman, Investors' Compensation Scheme. For services to the finance industry.
Peter Wilton Lee, Deputy Chairman, Carclo Engineering Group plc. For services to the steel industry.
Professor Peter Lees, Member, Veterinary Products Committee. For services to the veterinary profession.
John Patrick Leonard, Grade 5, Ordnance Survey, Department of the Environment.
Anthony John Lewis, Accountant, House of Commons.
Geoffrey Richard Lister, Director and Chief Executive, Bradford & Bingley. For services to the Building Society movement.
Richard Arthur Lloyd Livsey. For political service.
Brian Manley, Managing Partner, Manley Moon Associates. For services to Engineering and to training.
John Ferguson McClelland, Director of Manufacturing and Product Development, IBM United Kingdom for services to Industry and Education in Scotland.
Professor William Grigor McClelland, D.L. For charitable services in Tyne & Wear.
Robert McGee, Chairman, British Vita plc. For services to the Polymer and Textiles industry.
Professor Alasdair Duncan McIntyre.  For services to Fisheries and Conservation of the Aquatic Environment.
Jill McIvor, Q.S.M. For public services.
David McMurtry, Chairman and Chief Executive, Renishaw plc. For services to Science and Technology.
Professor Thomas Meade, Director, Medical Research Council's Epidemiology and Medical Care Unit and Honorary Consultant, St Bartholomew's Hospital, London and Northwick Park Hospital, Harrow. For services to Medicine and to Science.
Professor John Gareth Morris, Professor of Microbiology, University College of Wales, Aberystwyth. For services to Science.
Peter John Alexander Arthur Muir, Past Founding Chairman, Milton Keynes and North Buckinghamshire Training and Enterprise Council. For services to Training.
Nigel Musselwhite, Q.F.S.M., Territorial Inspector of Fire Service.
Donald Naismith, lately Director of Education, London Borough of Wandsworth. For services to Education.
John Mitchell Neill, Group Chief Executive, Unipart. For services to the Motor Car Industry.
Eric Newby, M.C., Travel Writer. For services to Literature.
Jennie Page, Chief Executive, English Heritage. For services to Conservation.
Ronald Talbot Parkinson, lately Chairman, Blackpool, Wyre and Fylde Health Authority. For services to Health Care.
John Matthew Croose Parry. For political service (fundraiser).
Matthew Le May Patient, lately Senior Technical Partner, Coopers & Lybrand. For services to the Accountancy Profession.
John Denys Charles Anstice Prideaux, lately Chairman, Union Railways. For services to Rail Transport.
Martin Charles Raff, Grade 4, Employment Service, Department of Employment.
Cecil Herbert Rapport, M.B.E. For charitable services in Cardiff.
Jessica Rawson Rawson. For services to the History of Art and Archaeology in China.
Henry Rimmer, Leader, Liverpool City Council. For services to Local Government.
Alexander Patrick Joseph Ross, Chairman, Joint Consultants Committee and Consultant Surgeon, Royal Hampshire County Hospital. For services to Medicine.
Derek Thomas Jones Rutherford, Grade 5, Department of Social Security. 
Doug Scott. For services to Mountaineering.
Madron Seligman, M.E.P., Member of the European Parliament for West Sussex. For political service.
Duncan McCallum Sharp, Grade 4, Crown Prosecution Service.
John Brian Shepherd, lately Grade 5, Her Majesty's Board of Inland Revenue.
Pranlal Sheth. For services to Community Relations.
Sidney Stewart Siddall, lately President, Association of the British Pharmaceutical Industry. For services to the Pharmaceutical Industry.
Roger Castle-Smith, M.B.E., Grade 5, Foreign and Commonwealth Office
Professor Thomas Christopher Smout, Deputy Chairman, Scottish Natural Heritage and Member, Royal Commission on the Ancient and Historical Monuments of Scotland. For services to Conservation.
Professor Olive Stevenson, Member, Social Security Advisory Committee. For services to the Development of Social Services.
Professor John Leslie Stollery, Head, College of Aeronautics, Cranfield University. For services to the Aviation Industry.
John Harold Vick Sutcliffe, Chairman, North Housing Association. For services to Housing and Conservation.
Professor Lindsay Symon, T.D., Professor of Neurological Surgery, Institute of Neurology and Honorary Consultant Neurosurgeon, National Hospital for Neurology and Neurosurgery. For services to Medicine.
Iris Elsie Mary Tarry, Vice Chairman and Former Conservative Leader, Hertfordshire County Council.  For services to Local Government.
Joan Thirsk. For services to Agrarian and Local History.
Bryan Sydney Townsend, Chairman, Midlands Electricity plc.  For services to the Electricity Industry.
John Anthony Wall, Chairman, Royal National Institute for the Blind. For services to Blind People.
Clifford William Welch, lately Acting Chairman, the Design Council. For services to Industrial Design.
Arthur Lewendon Wilson, lately Chief Executive, Stockport Metropolitan Borough Council. For services to Local Government.
Cecil Douglas Woodward, O.B.E., lately Chief Commoner, Corporation of London. For services to the Corporation of London.

Officer of the Order of the British Empire (OBE)

Military Division
Royal Navy
Commander Robin Patrick Parsons Burkitt, Royal Navy.
Commander Alan Arthur Colmer, Royal Navy. 
Commander William David Frisken, Royal Navy. 
Local Lieutenant Colonel Michael Peter Hitchcock, Royal Marines.
Major David Alan Hopley, Royal Marines. 
Major William Martin McDermott, Royal Marines.
Commander Brian Purnell, M.B.E., Royal Navy. 
Commander Robert Reeder, Royal Navy. 
Commander Timothy John Kay Sloane, Royal Navy.
Commander Dennis Richard Udy, Royal Navy.

Army
Lieutenant Colonel (Acting Colonel) Clive Richard Elderton (495507), The Royal Logistic Corps. 
Colonel Glynne Rhys Baylis Jones, T.D. (491933), late Royal Army Medical Corps, Territorial Army. 
Lieutenant Colonel John Mark Kane (499731), The Royal Logistic Corps.
Lieutenant Colonel Christopher Michael Edward Pugh (484007), Royal Tank Regiment. 
Lieutenant Colonel Colin Robinson, B.E.M. (499424), The Royal Logistic Corps (since retired). 
Lieutenant (Acting Lieutenant Colonel) Christopher James Rowland (471076), Army Cadet Force. 
Lieutenant Colonel Norman Geoffrey Smith (488100), Queen's Own Highlanders.
Lieutenant Colonel (now Colonel) Andrew Richard Evelyn De Cardonnel Stewart (493787), The Light Dragoons.
Lieutenant Colonel Simon Marcus Perrin Stewart, M.B.E. (483553), Queen's Dragoon Guards. 
Lieutenant Colonel Peter Anthony Wall (497536), Corps of Royal Engineers.
Lieutenant Colonel Donald Allan Rance, The Bermuda Regiment.

Royal Air Force
Wing Commander Terrence John Bacon (1936987), Royal Air Force.
Wing Commander Andrew Bowen Wight-Boycott (0608611), Royal Air Force. 
Wing Commander John Alfred Cliffe (8025930), Royal Air Force.
Wing Commander John Sutherland Douglas, M.B.E. (4232150), Royal Air Force.
Wing Commander Gordon Harris (1948063), Royal Air Force,
Wing Commander Anthony Peter Taylor Main (4232681), Royal Air Force (Retired).
Wing Commander Alastair Campbell Montgomery, M.B.E. (2619737), Royal Air Force.
Wing Commander William Kyle David Morrow (8025405), Royal Air Force.
Wing Commander (now Acting Group Captain) Paul Anthony Robinson (0609492), Royal Air Force. 
Wing Commander Roderick Graham Thompson (4232434), Royal Air Force.
Wing Commander Roger Utley (5201215), Royal Air Force.

Civil Division
Jack Abernethy, Member, Radioactive Waste Management Advisory Committee. For services to Environmental Protection.
John Allen, General Manager, Clarke Chapman Marine and Director, NEI Clarke Chapman Ltd. For services to the Defence Industry.
Terence James Anderson, Grade 7, Department of the Environment.
Eric Barker, lately Regional Pollution Control Manager, North West Region, National Rivers Authority.
William Frederick Barton. For political and public service.
Francis Streeter Bebbington, Vice President, Defence Marketing Pacific Rim, British Aerospace Defence Ltd. For services to the Defence Industry.
Mary, Mrs. Bentall, Chairman, Board of Visitors, Wolds Remand Centre. For services to Prison Visiting.
Vivian Norman Bingham. For political and public service.
Bernard Thomas Binnington, lately President, Harbours and Airport Committee, Jersey. For services to the community on Jersey.
Andrew Arthur Bishop, Second Master, Harrow School. For services to Science Education.
Claude Blair. For services to Church Conservation. 
James Blair, Curator, Perth Museum and Art Gallery. For services to the Arts.
Miss Joyce Blow (Mrs. Darlington), Member, Board of British Standards Institution. For services to Consumer Protection.
Rabbi Lionel Blue, Writer and Broadcaster.
Brian William Blunden, Managing Director, Pira International. For scientific services to the Paper, Printing and Publishing Industries.
Harold Davies Blundred, Chairman and Managing Director, Transit Holdings Ltd. For services to the Bus Industry.
Thomas Henry Boore, lately Chairman, National Caravan Council. For services to the Caravan Industry and to Tourism.
Benjamin Edward Boot, Member, MAFF's North Mercia Regional Panel. For services to Agriculture.
Michael Anthony Frederick Borrie, Manuscripts Librarian, the British Library.
Antony James Boyce, Chairman, South Devon Healthcare NHS Trust. For services to Health Care.
Philip Charles Bradbourn. For political and public service.
Stephen Bradshaw, Executive Director, Spinal Injuries Association. For services to Disabled People.
David Henry, Baron Brassey of Apethorpe, D.L. For services to the community in Northamptonshire.
Richard James Briggs. For services to the Development of Hyde Park.
Major William Garratt St. Stephen Brogan, D.L. For services to the Army Benevolent Fund in Leicestershire and Rutland.
Christopher David Brook, Grade 7, Her Majesty's Board of Customs and Excise.
Matthew Kennedy Browne, Medical Director, Monklands and Bellshill Hospitals NHS Trust and Consultant Surgeon, Monklands and District General Hospital, Glasgow. For services to Medicine.
Colin Brummitt, lately Finance Officer, University of Warwick. For services to Higher Education. 
Peter William Brunt, Consultant Physician, Aberdeen Royal NHS Trust. For services to Medicine.
Dilys Averil, Mrs. Burgess, Chairman, Policy Group, Independent Schools Joint Council. For services to Education.
Peter Henry Frederick Burton, Group Chief Executive, Bloxwich Engineering Ltd. For services to the Engineering Industry.
Frederick Bushe. For services to Sculpture.
Peter Buxton, Governor 1, Her Majesty's Prison, Frankland.
Gerald Cakebread, Grade 7, Hydrographic Office, Ministry of Defence.
Miss Judith Chalmers, Broadcaster and Vice Chairman, Holiday Care Service. For services to Holidays for People with Disabilities.
Alan Chapman, Official Receiver (B), Insolvency Service, Department of Trade and Industry. 
Philip Hemming Charters, Grade 7, Overseas Development Administration.
Anne, Mrs. Cheetham, M.B.E. For political and public service.
Andrew John George Chinn, Headmaster, Ferndale Comprehensive School, Mid-Glamorgan. For services to Education in Wales.
John Edward Holder Christie. For services to Truro Cathedral and to the community hi Cornwall.
Hector Goodfellow Clark, Q.P.M., lately Deputy Chief Constable, Lothian and Borders Police.
Elisabeth Kay, Mrs. Coleman, Chief Executive, Harveys and Company (Clothing) Ltd. For services to Equal Opportunities.
Kenneth George Churchill-Coleman, Q.P.M., Commander, Metropolitan Police.
Henry Anthony Coll. For services to Employment. 
Isabella Amelia, Mrs. Colvin, Member, Executive Committee, Women's National Commission. For services to Women's Issues and to the community. 
Elizabeth Margaret, Mrs. Conran, Curator, The Bowes Museum. For services to The Bowes Museum.
Colonel Mark Thurston Cook (Rtd.). For humanitarian services in former Yugoslavia. 
Angela Beryl Sackville, Mrs. Cope, Vice President, Royal Society for the Prevention of Cruelty to Animals. For services to Animal Welfare.
Robert Arthur Peter Coupe, Grade 7, Department of Health.
Sebert Leslie Cox, Assistant Chief Probation Officer, Home Office.
Colin Alexander Bell Crosby, Chairman, Grampian Housing Association. For services to the Housing Association Movement in Scotland. *David Lewis Crosby, Senior Consultant Surgeon, South Glamorgan. For services to the National Health Service in Wales.
George Crowther. For political and public service.
Ezekiel Adams Currie, Agricultural Inspector Grade 1, Department of Agriculture.
Miss Jane Helen Darbyshire. For services to Architecture.
Mary, Lady Davidson. For services to the community, particularly to Christian Aid, in Edinburgh.
Anthony Murles Davis. For services to the community in Sheffield.
Miss Caroline Harriet Dawes, Deputy Chairman, Occupational Pensions Board. For services to the Pensions Industry.
Gillian, Mrs. Dawson, County Vice President, St. John Ambulance Brigade, Jersey.
Captain James Charles Laurie De Coverly, Grade 6, Department of Transport.
Charles Martin de Selincourt, Chairman, Foundation for the Study of Infant Deaths.
Maureen Drew, Mrs. de Viell, Grade 7, Department of Employment.
Peter Delany, Courts Administrator, Lord Chancellor's Department, Leeds.
John Alexander Dempsey. For political and public service.
John MacMillan Walter Dinwoodie, Grade 6, Department of the Environment.
George Blyth Dorward, lately Member, Border Regional Council. For services to Local Government.
Stephen Thomas Doughty, Grade 7, National Audit Office.
Professor (John) Kerry Downes, Commissioner, Royal Commission on the Historical Monuments of England. For services to Architectural History.
Philip Duffin, Grade 7, Her Majesty's Board of Customs and Excise.
Gillian, Mrs. Duncan, lately Chairman, North Oxfordshire Area Advisory Panel on Justices of the Peace. For services to the Magistracy.
Robin Gardner Easton, Rector, High School of Glasgow. For services to Education.
Dorothy Joan, Mrs. Ekins, Chairman, Planning Services Committee, Fareham Borough Council. For services to Local Government.
Ian Robert Emmerson, President, British Cycling Federation. For services to Cycling.
Josephine, Mrs. Fairlie. For services to Industry and Commerce in Yorkshire.
John McCallum Ferguson. For services to Waste Management.
Jack Desmond Fisk, Member, Bristol City Council. For services to the Bristol Development Corporation.
Lord Mark Fitzalan Howard, lately Member, Lord Chancellor's Honorary Investment Advisory Committee.
James Anthony Fitzpatrick, lately Assistant Controller, Her Majesty's Board of Inland Revenue. 
James Wilson Flynn, Managing Director, Navico Ltd. For services to the Electronics Industry. 
Professor Max Fordham, Senior Partner, Max Fordham and Partners. For services to Engineering. 
David Oakley Arnold-Forster, T.D., Grade 7, Ministry of Defence.
Valerie Edith, Lady France, Headmistress, the City of London School for Girls. For services to Education.
Donald Frank Frost, lately Principal Valuer, Her Majesty's Board of Inland Revenue.
David Richard Fryer, Secretary General, Royal Town Planning Institute. For services to Town Planning.
Andrew Geddes, Controller, Her Majesty's Board of Inland Revenue.
Peter Bryan Gildersleeves, Grade 6, Office of Public Service and Science.
Miss Roma Gill, Lecturer and Writer. For services to English Literature.
Catherine Joyce, Mrs. Glanvill. For services to the British Red Cross and to the community in Devon.
William John Goldfinch, lately Director, Kent Training and Enterprise Council. For services to Training.
Graeme Gordon, Chairman, Scottish Quality Trout. For services to the Fish Farming Industry.
Martin Laing Gordon, Vice Chairman, S G Warburg and Co. Ltd. For services to Industry. 
David Roger Grayson, Managing Director, Business Strategy Group, Business in the Community. For services to Industry.
Ralph Green. For services to the Meat Industry. 
Edward Harry Grenfield, Music Critic. For service to Music and to Journalism.
Richard George Greenhow, Member, Dumfries and Galloway Regional Council and Member, Annandale and Eskdale District Council. For services to Local Government.
Anthony William Parke Gribble, Chairman, Rent Assessment Panel for Wales.
Philip John Hamilton-Grierson, Chairman, Management Committee, State Hospital, Carstairs. For public services in Scotland.
Miss Pamela Helen Gruber, Assistant Secretary (International and Development Affairs), Board for Social Responsibility, General Synod of the Church of England.
Christopher Clark Gustar, Managing Director, Westland Aerospace Holdings Ltd. For services to the Aerospace Industry.
John Peter Brookes Hadfield, D.L., Chairman, South Manchester University Hospitals NHS Trust. For services to the community in Manchester.
Mathew Joseph Hovey Hale, M.C., T.D., Chairman, T R Beckett Ltd. For services to the Newspaper Industry.
David Robertson Hall. For services to the Food Industry.
Professor Desmond Hammerton, Director, Clyde River Purification Board. For services to the Environment.
Thomas Trevor George Hardy, Chief Executive, East Cambridgeshire District Council. For services to Local Government.
Ralph David Hart. For services to the community, particularly the University of Essex, in Colchester. 
Betty, Mrs. Harvey, Chair of Governors, Lincolnshire College of Agriculture and Horticulture. For services to Education.
Robert Francis Haselden, lately Grade 6, Department of Trade and Industry.
Ruth Joyce, Mrs. Hawker, Director, Tor and South West College of Health Studies. For services to Health Care.
Professor John Gregory Hawkes, President, Linnean Society. For services to botany.
Vernon Walker Worsfold Hedderly. For services to Christian Charities through the Wallington Missionary Mart and Auctions.
The Reverend Mary Elizabeth Hewitt. For services to the Welfare of Young People.
Janet Cecilia Mary, Mrs. Hickman, lately Head, World Bank in London.
Michael Wren-Hilton. For political and public service.
William Edward Hindmarsh, Head of Operations, British Coal Corporation. For services to the Coal Industry.
Deborah Mary, Mrs. Hinton. For services to the community in Westminster, London.
Keith Hodge, lately Corporate Director, South Wales Region, Barclays Bank pic. For services to Banking.
Joan Catherine, Mrs. Holton, Grade 7, Department of Health.
Robin Harry Hood, Headteacher, Whitchurch High School, Cardiff and President, Welsh Secondary Schools' Association. For services to Education.
John Walter Horn, Headteacher, Ossett School, Wakefield. For services to Education.
Robin Clifford Horsfall, Grade 6, Ministry of Defence.
Hugh Richard Owen Humphreys, Managing Director, Delcam International pic. For services to Export.
Peter Ibbotson, Director of Construction and Engineering, J Sainsbury pic. For services to Energy Efficiency.
Professor Norman Lindsay Innes, Deputy Director, Scottish Crop Research Institute. For services to Agricultural Science.
Miss Marjorie Stephanie Irwin. For services to the Development of the Social Work Profession. 
Robert William Moore Irwin, Grade 6, Department of Health and Social Services.
Gerald Michael Isaaman, lately Editor, Hampstead and Highgate Express. For services to Journalism.
Peter Gordon Jarvis. For services to the community in Kingston upon Thames, Surrey.
Graham Rhodes Johnson, Concert accompanist. For services to Music.
Kenneth James Ross Johnston, General Manager, the Royal British Legion Industries.
Samuel Johnston, lately Acting National Secretary, National Council of Young Men's Christian Associations.
Michael Arthur Jones, Technical Director, GEC Marconi Dynamics Ltd. For service to the Defence Industry.
William Ian Jones, Consultant Ear, Nose and Throat Surgeon, West Glamorgan Health Authority. For services to Medicine.
Denis Walter Kellaway, Grade 6, Department for National Savings.
Annette, Mrs. Kerr, Overseas Personnel Officer, British Red Cross Society.
Shirley Patricia, Mrs. Knowles, Grade 7, Ministry of Defence.
John Herbert Lace, lately Chief Executive, Babcock Energy Ltd. For services to Engineering and to Public Life in Renfrewshire.
John Frederick Lambeth, Secretary, Liverpool Victoria Friendly Society. For services to the Friendly Society Movement.
Miss Nancy Jane Lane, Senior Research Associate, Department of Zoology, University of Cambridge and Fellow Girton College. For services to Science.
Royston David Layer, lately Grade 6, Ministry of Defence.
Mark Le Fanu, General Secretary, Society of Authors.
Peter Lederer, Managing Director, Gleneagles Hotels pic. For services to Tourism in Scotland. 
Neville Lees, Assistant Director of Public Health, Nottingham Health Authority. For services to Health Care.
Arthur James Winterbotham Lewis, Vice Chairman, British Clothing Industries Association. For services to the Clothing and Textile Industries. 
Richard Owen Lewis, Vice Chairman, Economic Development Committee, Association of District Councils. For services to Local Government in Wales.
Michael James Limb, lately General Secretary, Royal Automobile Club and Chairman, Speedway Control Board. For services to Motoring and Motor Sport.
John Graham Lindsay, lately Senior Engineering Inspector, Department of Trade and Industry.
Reginald John Little, lately Chairman, Dudley Advisory Committee on Justices of the Peace. For services to the Magistracy.
John Longbottom. For political service.
Keith Benjamin Madelin, County Surveyor, Shropshire County Council. For services to Road Transport.
Howard Mann, President, British Food Export Council and Member, Food From Britain Council. For services to the Food Industry.
David John Marlow, Chief Executive, Hammersmith and Queen Charlotte's Special Health Authority. For services to Health Care.
Harley Hamilton Marshall, Deputy Chairman, East Kilbride Development Corporation. For public services in the West of Scotland.
Terence Hedley Matthews, President and Chairman, Newbridge Networks Corporation. For services to the Communications Industry.
Peter Robert McAinsh, lately Chairman, Engineering Construction Industry Training Board. For services to Training.
William Henry McAndrew, lately Grade 6, Property Services Agency, Department of the Environment.
Alexander McBean, Grade 6, Department of Social Security.
Allen McClay. For services to the Pharmaceutical Industry.
Professor Donaldson McCloy. For services to Education.
Trevor Frank McCombie. For services to the Royal Society of Chemistry.
Peter David McDonald, Chairman, Devon Committee for the Employment of People with Disabilities.
Professor Bartholomew John McGettrick, Principal, St. Andrew's College of Education, Glasgow. For services to Education.
Jean Camilla, Mrs. McGinty, Vice President, SKILL. For services to Students with Disabilities.
Constance, Lady McIndoe, Chairman, sub-Committee B, Royal Air Force Benevolent Fund.
Malcolm McMillan, Grade 7, Ministry of Defence.
Kenneth McNeill, Q.F.S.M. For services to the Fire Service.
Arthur David Melzer, Managing Director, Premier Oil Pacific Ltd. For services to the Oil Industry.
Dorothy May, Mrs. Mercer, Director, Nursing and Patient Services, Royal Liverpool Hospital Trust. For services to Health Care.
Peter Mannering Middleton, Director, W S Atkins Ltd. For services to Engineering and to the Channel Tunnel Project.
Philip Mishon, Vice President, Royal Free Hospital Breast Cancer Appeal and for services to the Association of Jewish Ex-service Men and Women.
John Mitchell, Her Majesty's Staff Inspector of Schools, Scottish Office.
Martin Christopher Mitcheson. For services to the Prevention of Drug Misuse.
Grant Morris, Grade 6, Procurement Executive, Ministry of Defence.
Jon Kay-Mouat, lately President of the States of Alderney. For services to the community on Alderney.
Rob Murdy, Assistant Managing Director, Marketing and Trading, Safeway. For services to the Food Retailing Industry.
Michael George Nichol, Chairman, Executive Board, National Youth Agency. For services to Young People.
Ralph Rodney Vincent Nicholson, T.D. For services to the Church of England and to the community in Newcastle upon Tyne.
William Reed Nisbet, Representative Chairman, Sea Cadet Corps, Northern Region.
John Martyn Nixon, lately Grade 6, Department of Social Security.
Marie Vollam, Mrs. O'Brien, Chairman, South East Hampshire Advisory Committee on Justices of the Peace. For services to the Magistracy.
Godfrey Harland Odds, Chairman, Berkshire Family Health Services Authority. For services to Health Care.
Alan Oliver, Grade 6, Advisory, Conciliation and Arbitration Service, Department of Employment.
Godfrey George Olson. For political and public service.
Ronald Frederick Packham, Consultant, Binnie and Partners. For services to the Water Industry. 
John Niall Meredydd Parry, Seneschal, Priory for Wales, St. John Ambulance Brigade.
Brother Francis Patterson, Head, St. Francis Xavier's College, Liverpool. For services to Education.
Ann Judith, Mrs. Pearce. For political service. 
George Frederick Peterken, Woodland Ecology Consultant. For services to Forestry.
David Anthony Phillips, Dental Director, Medical Protection Society. For services to the Dental Profession.
Janet Mary, Mrs. Pugh. For services to the welfare of the Farming Community.
Professor Colin Buchanan Radford. For services to the Arts.
Anthony Damien Redmond. For medical services hi the former Yugoslavia.
Geoffrey Llewellyn Richards, Deputy Head, Science and Materials Division, Engineering and Physical Sciences Research Council. For services to Science.
Ivor Gifford Richards, Managing Director, Richards, Moorehead and Laing. For services to Civil Engineering.
Isaac Vivian Alexander Richards. For services to cricket.
David John Riddington, Chairman, Association of Drainage Authorities. For services to Agriculture and to the Environment.
Paul James Ernest Rink, Chairman, Blackburn Groundwork Trust. For services to Environmental Regeneration.
Professor William Ritchie, Senior Vice Principal, University of Aberdeen. For services to Higher Education.
Tony Bessent Roberts, Chief Executive, Cynon Valley Borough Council. For services to Local Government in Wales.
Reginald Robinson. For services to Journalism. 
(Henry) Richard Gwynne Robinson, Chairman, Major Spectator Sports Division, Central Council of Physical Recreation. For services to Sport.
Rita Susan, Mrs. Roth, Director, Sait Communications. For services to the Shipping Industry.
Peter Lomax Rothwell, District Inspector, Her Majesty's Board of Inland Revenue.
John Roylance, Chief Executive and Consultant Radiologist, United Bristol Healthcare NHS Trust. For services to Medicine.
Brian Scotney Russell, lately Principal Administrator, UK Steering Committee for Local Government Superannuation. For services to Local Government.
John Derek Sanders, lately Organist and Master of Choristers, Gloucester Cathedral. For services to Music.
Christopher John Saunders. For political service. 
Jill, Mrs. Saunders, Grade 7, Ministry of Defence.
Garry Edward Schofield. For services to Rugby League Football.
Garth Barrie Scotford, Q.F.S.M., lately Chief Fire Officer, Royal Berkshire Fire and Rescue Service.
George Mackenzie Shearer, Governor 1, Her Majesty's Prison, Shotts.
Michael Thomas Simmons, Chairman, Anglo Taiwan Trade Committee. For services to Export. 
John Vivian Simpson. For public services.
Susan, Mrs. Slocombe. For services to Women's Hockey.
Caroline Bridget, Mrs. Abel Smith. For political and public service.
Leslie William Smith, lately Managing Director, Trainload Freight, British Railways Board. For services to the Rail Industry.
Alison, Mrs. Smithies, lately Regional Consultant, in Primary Care, Wessex Regional Health Authority. For services to Medicine.
Brigadier Thomas Stuart Sneyd, Deputy Secretary, Council of Territorial, Auxiliary and Volunteer Reserve Associations.
John Thompson Spare. For political and public service.
Margaret Anne, Mrs. Spurr, Headmistress, Bolton School Girls' Division. For services to Education. 
John Simon Stanley, Grade 7, Department of Employment.
Alistair Donald Stewart, Chairman, Review Committee, Swansea Prison Parole Board.
David Burnside Stewart. For services to the Dairy Industry.
Joseph Martin Stewart. For services to the Police. 
Donald Andrew Stirling, Regional Reporter to Children's Panel, Lothian Region. For services to Young People.
Richard Henry Butler-Stoney, Vice President, Norfolk Churches Trust. For services to Church Preservation.
Peter Louis Style, Executive Director, British Overseas Trade Group for Israel. For services to Export.
Laxmidas Narandas Swali, Grade 6, Department of Transport.
Angela Mary, Mrs. Thomas, D.L., Honorary Vice President, British Red Cross Society, Cumbria.
Professor Williamina Walker Thomson, Professor of International Health, Queen Margaret College, Edinburgh. For services to Health Care.
Frederick Thornley. Chief Ambulance Officer for Oxford and Regional Ambulance Officer, Oxford Region. For services to Health Care.
Robert Girling Tilmouth, lately Chief Executive, Tyne and Wear Chamber of Commerce. For services to Industry and Commerce through the Chamber of Commerce Movement.
David Paul Bryan Tomblin. For services to the Film Industry.
Kenneth John Tout, Voluntary Worker, Help Age International. For services to the Elderly.
Colin Vivian Underwood, Consultant Director, Road Surface Dressing Association. For services to Road Construction and Engineering.
Captain Edward Maurice Usherwood, D.S.C., Royal Navy (Rtd.), Vice President, Soldiers', Sailors' and Airmen's Families Association, Suffolk.
Janice Mary, Mrs. Venables. For services to the Women's Royal Voluntary Service in Oxfordshire.
John Walsh. For political and public service. 
Donald Henry Waters, Deputy Chairman and Chief Executive, Grampian Television. For services to Broadcasting.
Anthony Gordon Watts, Director, National Institute for Careers Education and Counselling. For services to Education.
Miss Anne Margaret Watts, Equal Opportunities Director, Midland Bank and Commissioner Equal Opportunities Commission. For services to Equal Opportunities.
Donald Marshall Weston, Assistant Controller (Personnel), Her Majesty's Board of Inland Revenue.
Brian George Whitehouse, lately Grade 5, Department of Education.
Walter Richard Wignall, lately Managing Director, Matra Marconi Space (UK) Ltd. For services to the Space Industry.
Rodney Gordon Wilkinson, First Secretary, Foreign and Commonwealth Office.
David Trefor Williams, Senior Visiting Research Fellow in Health Education, University of Southampton. For services to Health Education.
Richard Wilson, Actor and Director. For services to Drama.
Mary Eileen, Mrs. Wimbury, Vice Chair, Executive Committee, National Association of Volunteer Bureaux.
Peter Edric Wood, Chairman, West Yorkshire Commissioning Health Authority. For services to Health Care.
Pamela, Lady Youde. For voluntary and charitable services, particularly to China.

Member of the Order of the British Empire (MBE)

Ron Thomas, for services to Bowling and to People with Disabilities.

Royal Red Cross

Member of the Royal Red Cross (RRC)
 Claire Mavis Taylor, Principal Nursing Officer, A.R.R.C., Queen Alexandra's Royal Naval Nursing Service.
 Colonel lona Mary LEITH-MACGREGOR (490474), late Queen Alexandra's Royal Army Nursing Corps.

Associate of the Royal Red Cross (ARRC)
 24162890 Warrant Officer Class 1 Peter Charles COOPER, Queen Alexandra's Royal Army Nursing Corps.
 Major Jean Danskin THORNTON (468868), Queen Alexandra's Royal Army Nursing Corps (since retired).
 Squadron Leader Wendy Elizabeth JOY (0409028), Princess Mary's Royal Air Force Nursing Service.

Queen's Police Medal (QPM)
England And Wales
 Ralph Charles Barrington, Detective Chief Superintendent, Essex Police.
 Hugh Neville Linton Blenkin, 3 Area Headquarters, Metropolitan Police.
 Trevor Cutts, Detective Superintendent, Nottinghamshire Constabulary.
 Anthony Michael Grey, Deputy Chief Constable, Warwickshire Constabulary.
 Dennis George Gunn, Chief Constable, Cambridgeshire Constabulary.
 Peter John Henry Holmes, Inspector, 5 Area, Metropolitan Police.
 Michael Kenneth Jenkins, Detective Chief Superintendent, West Midlands Police.
 Clive Rowland Kingswood, Detective Sergeant, West Yorkshire Police.
 Jeffrey Meadows, Chief Superintendent, Lancashire Constabulary.
 David John Mellish, Deputy Chief Constable, Northumbria Police.
 Alan Parker, Deputy Chief Constable, British Transport Police.
 Maurice George Parsons, Superintendent, 5 Area, Metropolitan Police.
 Gwilym Eifion Pritchard, Deputy Chief Constable, Dyfed Powys Police.
 Peter Samuel sharpe, Deputy Chief Constable, Surrey Police.
 Barry Dennis DeCourcy Shaw, Chief Constable, Cleveland Constabulary.
 Peter Francis Smither, Senior Instructor (Supt), Police Branch, Counter Terrorist Search Wing, RSME, Chattenden.
 Mark Toker, Constable, Cheshire Constabulary.
 David Christopher Veness, Assistant Commissioner, Specialist Operations, Metropolitan Police.

Northern Ireland
 Robert James Ballantine, Superintendent, Royal Ulster Constabulary.
 Thomas Robert Robinson, Superintendent, Royal Ulster Constabulary.

Overseas
 David Deptford, Chief Superintendent, Royal Hong Kong Police.
 Douglas Lau Yuk-kuen, Assistant Commissioner, Royal Hong Kong Police.
 Basil Francis Lim Sak-yeung, Assistant Commissioner, Royal Hong Kong Police.
 Benny Ng Ching-kwok, Chief Superintendent, Royal Hong Kong Police.

Scotland
 Graham Power, Deputy Chief Constable (Temporary), Lothian and Borders Police.
 Andrew Mathieson, Assistant Chief Constable, Fife Constabulary.

Queen's Fire Service Medal (QFSM)
England And Wales
 James Lynn Ashfield, Senior Divisional Officer, Royal Berkshire Fire Service.
 Kenneth Arthur Harrison, Deputy Chief Officer, Humberside Fire Service.
 Edwin Patterson, Chief Fire Officer, Nottinghamshire Fire Service.
 Michael John Pilley, Assistant Chief Officer, South Yorkshire Fire Service.
 Charles William Spence, Station Officer, Durham County Fire and Rescue Brigade.

Overseas
 Paul Chan Hoi, Chief Fire Officer, Hong Kong Fire Service.

Scotland
 Robert Gordon, Deputy Firemaster, Highlands and Islands Fire Brigade.

Colonial Police and Fire Service Medal (CPM)
 John Edward Burton, Superintendent, Royal Hong Kong Police Force.
 Chan Kwok-kan, Senior Superintendent (Auxiliary), Royal Hong Kong Police Force.
 Cheung Chiu-wai, Station Sergeant, Royal Hong Kong Police Force.
 Chiang Kwok-keung, Superintendent, Royal Hong Kong Police Force.
 Kedith Chow Keng-kan, Superintendent, Royal Hong Kong Police Force.
 Martin Swinnerton Cowley, Senior Superintendent, Royal Hong Kong Police Force.
 Michael Harold Francis, Senior Superintendent, Royal Hong Kong Police Force.
 Ho King-san, Principal Fireman, Hong Kong Fire Services.
 Kwok Jing-keung, Senior Divisional Officer, Hong Kong Fire Services.
 Kwok Yiu-wai, Station Sergeant, Royal Hong Kong Police Force.
 Lam Yim-fat, Chief Inspector, Royal Hong Kong Police Force.
 Lau Yui-ki, Station Sergeant, Royal Hong Kong Police Force.
 Lee Ming-kwai, Chief Superintendent, Royal Hong Kong Police Force.
 Leung Sum, Inspector, Royal Hong Kong Police Force.
 Lo Sik-lun, Principal Fireman, Hong Kong Fire Services.
 Neil Edward Harrell Mccabe, Chief Superintendent, Royal Hong Kong Police Force.
 John Ng Sheung-lok, Superintendent, Royal Hong Kong Police Force.
 Norman Alexander Rae, Senior Superintendent, Royal Hong Kong Police Force.
 Jeffrey Sanders, Chief Inspector, Bermuda Police Force.
 Campbell DeCosta Simons, Superintendent, Bermuda Police Force.
 Sin King-ki, Station Sergeant, Royal Hong Kong Police Force.
 Ian James Stenton, Superintendent, Royal Hong Kong Police Force.
 Tsang Loi-fuk, Chief Inspector, Royal Hong Kong Police Force.
 Wong Tim-fat, Superintendent, Royal Hong Kong Police Force.
 Wu Kwong-cheung, Station Sergeant, Royal Hong Kong Police Force

New Zealand

References

Birthday Honours
1994 awards in the United Kingdom
1994 awards